Guevaria is a genus of South American flowering plants in the family Asteraceae.

 Species
 Guevaria alvaroi R.M.King & H.Rob.
 Guevaria loxensis (S.F.Blake & Steyerm.) R.M.King & H.Rob.
 Guevaria micranthera H.Rob.
 Guevaria sodiroi (Hieron. ex Sodiro) R.M.King & H.Rob.
 Guevaria vargasii (Chung) R.M.King & H.Rob.

References

 
Asteraceae genera
Flora of South America
Taxonomy articles created by Polbot